The 2014 Northern Arizona Lumberjacks football team represented Northern Arizona University in the 2014 NCAA Division I FCS football season. They were led by 17th-year head coach Jerome Souers and played their home games at the Walkup Skydome. They were a member of the Big Sky Conference. They finished the season 7–5, 5–3 in Big Sky play to finish in a tie for fifth place.

Schedule

Source: Official Schedule

Ranking movements

References

Northern Arizona
Northern Arizona Lumberjacks football seasons
Northern Arizona Lumberjacks football